Transfer coefficient may refer to:

Transport phenomena
 Heat transfer coefficient
 Mass transfer coefficient

Electrochemistry
 Charge transfer coefficient

Non-scalar coefficients
Transfer coefficients which take the form of a matrix are sometimes called a transfer matrix.

See also
 Transport coefficient